Principles: Life & Work is a 2017 book by hedge fund manager Ray Dalio based on principles he had developed while leading Bridgewater Associates. These Principles for Success were also made available as an ultra mini-series adventure by the author.

Development 

After receiving a frank memo from his top lieutenants in 1993 concerning his interpersonal performance as a manager, Bridgewater Associates' Ray Dalio began to develop a unique company culture based on principles and unadorned feedback. He originally published a shorter version of Principles online in 2011, where it received over three million downloads. It was officially released as Principles: Life & Work on September 19, 2017, by Simon & Schuster.

References

Further reading

External links
 

2017 non-fiction books
Business books
English-language books
Simon & Schuster books